Here's the Deal: A Memoir is a 2022 autobiography by Kellyanne Conway.

References

External links 

 
 

2022 non-fiction books
English-language books
Autobiographies
Threshold Editions books
American memoirs
Books about the Trump administration